András Benk (born September 3, 1987) is a Hungarian professional ice hockey winger who plays for Újpesti TE in the MOL Liga. He joined after a 9-year tenure with Alba Volán Székesfehérvár in the Austrian Hockey League.

He was member of the Hungarian national team which won promotion to the top division World Championship in 2008 after seventy years of absence. Benk also made into the team in the next year, however, just in his second match of the championship, following a hit by Scottie Upshall, he suffered a broken collar bone and had to sit out the rest of the tournament.

Awards & Achievements
Hungarian Championship:
Winner: 2008, 2009, 2010, 2011
IIHF World Championship Division I:
Winner: 2008

References

External links

1987 births
Fehérvár AV19 players
Dunaújvárosi Acélbikák players
Hungarian ice hockey left wingers
Living people
Ice hockey people from Budapest
Hungarian expatriate sportspeople in Sweden
Újpesti TE (ice hockey) players